The 2013 Melbourne Challenger was a professional tennis tournament played on outdoor hard court. It was the first edition of the tournament which was part of the 2013 ATP Challenger Tour. It took place in Melbourne, Australia between 21 and 27 October 2013.

Singles main draw entrants

Seeds

 Rankings are as of October 14, 2013.

Other entrants
The following players received wildcards into the singles main draw:
  Thanasi Kokkinakis
  Luke Saville
  Jordan Thompson
  Andrew Whittington

The following players received entry from the qualifying draw:
  Maverick Banes
  Blake Mott
  Kento Takeuchi
  James Lemke

Champions

Singles

 Matthew Ebden def.  Tatsuma Ito 6–3, 5–7, 6–3

Doubles

 Thanasi Kokkinakis /  Benjamin Mitchell def.  Alex Bolt /  Andrew Whittington 6–3, 6–2

External links
Official Website
ATP official site

Melbourne Challenger
Melbourne Challenger
2013 in Australian tennis